Cytochrome-b5 reductase  is a NADH-dependent enzyme that converts ferricytochrome from a Fe3+ form to a Fe2+ form. It contains FAD and catalyzes the reaction:

In its b5-reducing capacity, this enzyme is involved in desaturation and elongation of fatty acids, cholesterol biosynthesis, and drug metabolism.

This enzyme can also reduce methemoglobin to normal hemoglobin, gaining it the inaccurate synonym methemoglobin reductase. Isoforms expressed in erythrocytes (CYB5R1, CYB5R3) perform this function in vivo. Ferricyanide is another substrate in vitro.

The following four human genes encode cytochrome-b5 reductases:
 CYB5R1
 CYB5R2
 CYB5R3
 CYB5R4
 CYB5RL

See also
 Cytochrome b5
 Diaphorase
 Methemoglobinemia
 Reductase
 Leghemoglobin reductase

References

External links
 

EC 1.6.2